The 1951 Stanley Cup Finals was contested by the Toronto Maple Leafs and the Montreal Canadiens. The Maple Leafs won the series 4–1, with all five games going into overtime. It was the Toronto franchise's ninth Stanley Cup win and the last in a series of six wins starting in 1942. It was the first appearance in a string of ten consecutive appearances by the Canadiens.

Paths to the Finals
Toronto defeated the Boston Bruins 4–1 to reach the Finals. Montreal defeated the defending champion Detroit Red Wings 4–2 to reach the Finals.

Game summaries
Every game went into overtime in this series. Bill Barilko scored the Cup-winning goal, his last goal in the NHL as he would die in a plane crash during the summer.

Stanley Cup engraving
The 1951 Stanley Cup was presented to Maple Leafs captain Ted Kennedy by NHL President Clarence Campbell following the Maple Leafs 3–2 overtime win over the Canadiens in game five.

The following Maple Leafs players and staff had their names engraved on the Stanley Cup

1950–51 Toronto Maple Leafs

Engraving mistakes
Several mistakes happened in the engraving of the names:
 Gus Mortson's last name was misspelled WORTSON with a "W" instead a "M".
 Danny Lewicki's last name was misspelled LEWESKI, with a "S" instead of a "C".
 Ted Kennedy's name was misspelled KENNEDYY with an extra "Y".  His position as Captain was also left off the Stanley Cup.
 William A. H. MacBrien's last name was misspelled as McBrien, missing an "A"
 Elwin "Al" Rollins' first name was misspelled ELVIN with a "V" instead a "W".  The Rollins mistake was not corrected on the Replica Cup created in 1992–93.  The other 4 mistakes were corrected on the Replica Cup.

Members of Toronto Maple Leafs that won 4 cups in 5 years 1947, 1948, 1949, 1951 dynasty
Bill Barilko, Turk Broda, Ted Kennedy†, Joe Klukay, Howie Meeker, Gus Mortson, Jimmy Thomson, Harry Watson (8 players),

Ed Bickle†, John Bickell†, Conn Smythe†, John Mordoch†, William MacBrien†, Hap Day†, Tim Daly†, George Walker, Ed Finkin, Horance McIntre (10 non-players).

† also won the Stanley Cup in 1945.

See also
 1950–51 NHL season

Notes

References
 
 

 

 
Stanley Cup
Stanley Cup Finals
Stanley Cup Finals
Ice hockey competitions in Toronto
Ice hockey competitions in Montreal
Stanley Cup Finals
1950s in Montreal
1951 in Quebec
1950s in Toronto